Amanda Ledesma (December 31, 1911 – February 19, 2000) was an Argentine film actress and singer. Ledesma appeared in several tango films such as The Tango Star (1940). In 1939 she was originally cast to appear in the American film The Sons Command, but did not appear in the final production.

Selected filmography
 Dancing (1933)
 Paths of Faith (1938)
 The Tango Star (1940)
 De México llegó el amor (1940)
 Tomorrow I'll Kill Myself (1942)
 Marina (1945)
 Cuando quiere un mexicano (1944)

References

Bibliography 
 Waldman, Harry. Hollywood and the Foreign Touch: A Dictionary of Foreign Filmmakers and Their Films from America, 1910-1995.

External links 
 

1911 births
2000 deaths
Argentine stage actresses
Argentine film actresses
20th-century Argentine women singers
Actresses from Buenos Aires
Singers from Buenos Aires
20th-century Argentine actresses